Saint Landry is an unincorporated community in Evangeline Parish, Louisiana, United States. Its ZIP code is 71367.

Notes

Unincorporated communities in Evangeline Parish, Louisiana
Unincorporated communities in Louisiana